Christoph Peters (born 1966) is a German author of novels and short stories. His debut novel, Stadt Land Fluss was published in 1999, and won the Aspekte-Literaturpreis for the best German literary debut. It was followed by a collection of short stories in 2001, and, in 2007, his first novel to be published in English, The Fabric of Night (Random House). Peters lives in Berlin. He received the Rheingau Literatur Preis in 2009 and the Friedrich-Hölderlin-Preis in 2016.

Works

Novels

Short stories

English translations

References

Further reading

External links 

 

Living people
1966 births
German male writers